Kasuku Bilago was a Tanzanian politician and a member of the Chadema political party. He was elected MP representing Buyungu in 2015. Bilago died on 28 May 2018 after a brief illness.

References 

Date of birth missing
2018 deaths
Chadema MPs
Chadema politicians
Members of the National Assembly (Tanzania)
Tanzanian MPs 2015–2020